5′′-phosphoribostamycin phosphatase (EC 3.1.3.88) is an enzyme with systematic name 5′′-phosphoribostamycin phosphohydrolase. This enzyme catalyses the following chemical reaction

 5′′-phosphoribostamycin + H2O  ribostamycin + phosphate

This enzyme is involved in the biosynthesis of several aminocyclitol antibiotics, including ribostamycin, neomycin and butirosin.

References

External links 
 

EC 3.1.3